CYLD may refer to:

 Chapleau Airport, an airport in Ontario, Canada (ICAO code)
 CYLD (gene), a human gene, mutations of which have been associated with cylindromatosis, multiple familial trichoepithelioma, and Brooke-Spiegler syndrome